Inagawa may refer to:

5851 Inagawa (provisional designation: 1991 DM1), a main-belt minor planet
Inagawa, Hyōgo, town in Kawabe District, Hyōgo, Japan
Inagawa Circuit, 1.030 km motor racing circuit in Japan
Inagawa Dam, dam in Nagano Prefecture, Japan
Inagawa-kai, the third largest of Japan's yakuza gangs
So Inagawa, Japanese DJ and producer

People with the surname
Kakuji Inagawa, founder of the Inagawa-kai
Toi Inagawa, son of Kakuji Inagawa and Godfather of the Inagawa-kai
Yutaka Inagawa, Japanese artist
 Mana Inagawa, a fictional character in Valkyrie Drive- Bhikkhuni

Japanese-language surnames